Dayton Flyers basketball may refer to either of the basketball teams that represent the University of Dayton:
Dayton Flyers men's basketball
Dayton Flyers women's basketball